Bratsa Bonifacho (Braca Bonifacije; born February 10, 1937, in Yugoslavia) is a painter. He became a Canadian citizen in 1976 and now lives in Vancouver, Canada. Working from a discipline based in formalism, he is an abstract expressionist who chooses between many elements including symbolist and figurative to express non-verbal thoughts and emotions abstractly.

Life and work
Bonifacho grew up in Belgrade during World War II's German occupation. He speaks Serbian, Russian, and English. Before settling in Vancouver, Canada in 1973 and becoming a Canadian citizen in 1976, he lived as a painter in France.

Utilizing techniques and relying on skills culled from over 25 years of training and 55 years practice in the arts, Bonifacho works in the medium of oil which he applies to large squares and rectangles of prepared canvas. On occasion, he has also used encaustic for its tactility and luminosity. Periodically, Bonifacho has focused on qualities of geometry, surface, gesture, and sgraffito in metallic paints as a relief from working with prismatic colour. His work is represented by the Bau-Xi Gallery in Toronto and Vancouver (Canada), the Foster/White Gallery in Seattle (US), and the Masters Gallery in Calgary (Canada).

An accomplished musician, Bonifacho fell in love with jazz in the 1950s and studied at the School for Jazz (Dept. Of Drums) which was operated by the Belgrade Association of Jazz Musicians. After graduating, he was both leader and drummer for the Braca Bonfacije Dixie Quintet in Belgrade from 1957–1960.

Education
Sumatovacka School of Art, Belgrade (Drawing and Painting), 1959–1960
Bachelor of Fine Arts (BFA) University of Belgrade, 1961–1964
Bachelor of Architecture (B. Arch) University of Belgrade Faculty of Architecture, 1964–1967
Atelier Kruger (Old Master printing techniques), Frankfurt Germany, summer seminars, 1966-1968
Completion of one year course. School for Jazz (operated by the Belgrade Association of Jazz Musician) – Department of Drums, 1959

Important themes
Bonifacho's earliest work dating from 1959-1963 was the politically motivated and intensely emotional "Eyes over Belgrade" series. He used roof tops and the exterior surfaces of buildings as massive canvases where he painted target-like pop designs critiquing war and the US and Russian space race while engendering ire in his neighbours.  Even though Yugoslavia had pulled out of the Warsaw Pact in 1948 and Belgrade was as artistically progressive as London (for example, noted New York-based performance and fellow Serbian-born artist Marina Abramović was a member of Bonifacho's social and artistic milieu), it was under the rule of president-for-life, Josip Broz Tito.
The themes of war, nuclear holocausts, environmental devastation, and human vulnerability have dominated much of Bonifacho's work, as noted in an article by social activist and author Christian Parenti in his comments about Bonifacho's 25-year retrospective show at Belgrade's Progress Gallery (Galerija Progres) in 2000.

The first paintings to gain Bonifacho critical acclaim in Canada were the Blackboards series produced between 1978 and 1982. The series features racing greyhounds, targets, pop culture symbols (e.g. Marilyn Monroe) and/or American flags in sometimes unexpected juxtapositions. They are a commentary on the "rat race, the arms race, and the space race," and human vulnerability.

Bonifacho also references sexuality both overt and covert, in the context of global bio-degradation, nuclear devastation, and anti-war themes.

Landscapes have played an important role in Bonifacho's work as more than just reference points for geography; Alberta Landscapes, his first series after immigrating to Canada, not only played a locative role but was also a means of coming to grips with memories of war-ravaged landscapes and environmental devastation and yearnings for imagined landscapes.

The Parallelograms series stands in sharp contrast as it is a meditative, minimalist series that is limited to gold and black while the greater body of Bonifacho's work is saturated with prismatic colour.

Always fascinated with language, Bonifacho's painting titles from the earliest days feature word play. He also mischievously embeds words from various languages in his paintings, daring the viewer to find and make sense of them. His Habitat Pixel series depicts computer viruses while referencing the alphabet, typography, and the printing press.

The city of Vancouver (Canada), Bonifacho's adopted home, honoured him by hanging six images  chosen from his Habitat Pixel series on city banners that were displayed along major thoroughfares and bridges in 2008. He joined the company of such internationally renowned local artists as Jack Shadbolt, Toni Onley, Gordon A. Smith, and Bill Reid.

In what could be described as a 'tour de force', Bonifacho's 2013 series, Testament Papers, features five compositional styles integrating themes explored over several years. By constraining himself to a grid format and enclosing symbols, he freed himself to comment anew, both seriously and humorously, on pollution, war, sex, energy, politics, and more. Using symbols such as letters from the Romanized and Cyrillic alphabets, numbers, and drawing words from multiple languages (Hebrew, Italian, Serbian, Russian, French, German, Spanish, Latin, etc.) and the five styles used in this series, Testament Papers, is richly evocative of abstract art, expressionist painting, and symbolic representation. Taken as a whole, Testament Papers, is a workshop demonstration of an artist's consummate skill, intuition, passion, history, and infinite creative drive.

References

Notes

Bibliography
 
 
 Godley, Elizabeth. "Wood turns his eye to West Coast landscape." The Vancouver Sun. Wednesday, Oct. 18, 1987: C5.
 Grace, Sherrill. "Bonifacho at Atelier Gallery." Vanguard. February/March 1988: 40.
 Johnson, Mia. "Reflections of a jazz musician." The West Ender. June 24, 1982: 23.
 Lassagne, Louise. "Bratso [sic] Bonifacho à la Heffel Gallery." Le Soleil de Colombie. Vendredi, 28 Octobre 1988: 33.
 Lindberg, Ted. "Bratsa Bonifacho: Parallelograms." Artichoke; Writing about the Visual Arts 9.3 (1997): 28-31.
 Parenti, Christian. "Art in the enemy camp: Letter from Bohemian Belgrade." San Francisco Bay Guardian. September 6, 2000: 25-26.
 
 Johnson, Mia. "Testament Paper—Vancouver 2012 - 2013." Self-published in collaboration with Bau-Xi Gallery, Vancouver & Toronto, 2014.

Further reading
 Armstrong, John. "Abstractionist lays bloody, brutal memories on the bull's eye." The Vancouver Sun, Vancouver, BC
 Baillaut, Jeanne. "La Habana de Bonifacho," Le Soleil de Colombie, Vancouver, BC, review of exhibition, Bau-Xi Gallery, Vancouver, BC
 Richardson, Joan. "Bratsa Bonifacho: Al Campo Santo; review of exhibition at Fran Willis Gallery, Victoria", Vie des Arts, 1999 (?)
 Currie, Rosemarie. "Combustion + Earth and Fire; Two series of works by Bonifacho; A retrospective catalogue."  2005: 8-9
 Farr, Sheila. "Canadian art comes south of the border." The Herald, Seattle, review of exhibition, Whatcom Museum, Bellingham
 Johnson, Mia. "Bonifacho." Artmagazine, Toronto, review of exhibition, Burnaby Art Gallery, Burnaby, BC
 Jajic, Branka. "Crne table otpora." Novine Zrenjanin, Zrenjanin
 Jankovic, Nebojsa, Braca Bonifacije. "Havana moje mladosti (Havana of my youth)." Kisobran, Vancouver
 Kovski, Tirpani. "Boja c krova na plantu (Colour of the roof is on the canvas)." Illustrovana Politika, Belgrade, Yugoslavia, July 8, 2000
 Laurence, Robin. "Bonifacho's Habitat Pixel." The Georgia Straight, Vancouver, BC
 Lindberg, Ted. "Combustion + Earth and Fire; Two series of works by Bonifacho; A retrospective catalogue." 2005: 7
 Lindberg, Ted. "Landscape Paintings; Works on Canvas and Paper; A retrospective catalogue." 2005: 7-9
 Lindberg, Ted. "Parallelograms catalogue." 2005: 7-17
 Nikolic, Teodora. "Pun kofer avantura: Secanja Braca Bonifacija [A suitcase full of adventure: memories of Bratsa Bonifacho]." Glorija, Belgrade
 Panic, Anita. "Po Krovovima Sveta [On the roofs of the world]." Prestup, Belgrade
 Petrovic, Dragana. "Vankuver zamirse na Srbijn: kadja pristavim sarmu (Vancouver smells like Serbia when I am cooking cabbage rolls.)" Licnosti, Belgrade, June 2000
 Rosenberg, Ann. "Capturing motion." The Vancouver Sun, Vancouver, BC
 Rosenberg, Ann. "Blackboards; and related works 1978-1992." Catalogue, 2006: 5-15
 Rosenberg, Ann. "La Habana and Peloponessus catalogue." 2007: 25-49
 Rosenberg, Ann. "Richmond comes of age." The Vancouver Sun, Vancouver, review of exhibition, Richmond Art Gallery
 Tomak, Novo. "Mocnicima saljem poruke us virusim (To the mighty ones I'm sending messages with viruses)." Novosti, Belgrade, July 2007
 Cramp, Beverly. "BRATSA BONIFACHO, Inside Habitat Pixel, February 24 to April 7, 2012, Evergreen Cultural Centre, Coquitlam." Galleries West, Dec. 31, 2011.
 Laurence, Robin. "Bratsa Bonifacho: Inside Habitat Pixel." The Georgia Straight, Feb 29, 2012
 
 Johnson, Mia. "Bratsa Bonifacho: Skalamerija and Messages," Preview: The Gallery Guide, Vancouver, September/October 2012
 Flock, T. S. "Bratsa Bonifacho: SKALAMERIJA at Foster/White." Seattle Arts News, 2012
 Bonifacho: Retrospective: 1973 - 2013–40 years in Vancouver. Self-published in collaboration with Bau-Xi Gallery, Vancouver & Toronto, 2012
Laurence, Robin. "Bratsa Bonifacho: Inside Habitat Pixel", The Georgia Straight, Feb 29, 2012
Cantor, Allyn. "Bratsa Bonifacho: Grazioso Sempre" Preview Of Visual Arts. Vancouver, 2014
"Bonifacho, Cetrdeset Godina u Vankuveru", Politika, Beograd, 2014
Gedeon, Julie. "Bonifacho Artist Profile, The Power of Symbols", Bau-Xi Gallery, Vancouver, Autumn 2016
The Oddville Press, selection of images, Summer 2017          
Stosic, Marija. "Hidden Messages: Bratsa Bonifacho’s Paintings from the Collection of the Belgrade City Museum", exhibition catalogue, 2018
M. Dimitrijevic. "Hidden Messages" Bratsa Bonifacije, Politika, Sep 12, 2018.

External links
Bratsa Bonifacho personal website
 Bau-Xi Gallery gallery website
 Foster/White Gallery gallery website
 Masters Gallery gallery website

1937 births
Living people
20th-century Canadian painters
Canadian male painters
21st-century Canadian painters
Artists from Belgrade
Artists from Vancouver
University of Belgrade Faculty of Architecture alumni
Yugoslav emigrants to Canada
Artists from British Columbia
20th-century Canadian male artists
21st-century Canadian male artists